The Trabocchi Coast, which corresponds to the coastal stretch Adriatic of province of Chieti (Abruzzo), is a 70-kilometer coast from Ortona to San Salvo in Italy. It comprises a number of coves and reefs below the hills that end at the Adriatic Sea marked by the spread of Trabucco - fishing machines on piles. Many of the towns on the Coast maintain their own characteristics and traditions.

Municipalities 

The municipalities that compose it are part of the province of Chieti and are as follows:

 Francavilla al Mare
 Ortona
 San Vito Chietino
 Rocca San Giovanni
 Fossacesia
 Torino di Sangro
 Casalbordino
 Vasto
 San Salvo

Geography 

The coast does not present itself homogeneous in the various sections that compose it, but, on the contrary, it changes greatly in appearance. There are stretches of sandy beach and low (as in Francavilla, Ortona, Casalbordino, Vasto and San Salvo) and sections pebbles (a Fossacesia, Torino di Sangro), as well as high and rocky sections (in San Vito Chietino and Rocca San Giovanni). The coastal strip makes its way through valleys and hills, ending sea, give life to landscapes and natural environments of various kinds. From the urban point of view, the urban layout of this stretch of coast does not share the characteristics of continuity and linearity of its so-called Adriatic city that develops in a more or less continuous from Ortona to Rimini although phenomena "francavillizzazione" in course not lacking.

The coastline is long 6 km approximately and is divided into a stretch of sandy beach (Le Morge) to the north, and a gravelly stretch (Green Coast) to the south; In latter-diving underwater.

The sandy beach is protected by a system of breakwaters placed a short distance from the shore in order to combat erosion and storm surges, as reported in local newspapers, they have in the past destroyed the bridge of the Adriatic highway.

It is for this reason that the beach of Costa Verde, formerly in the sand, was placed in the gravel, just to stop the relentless and unstoppable advance of the sea; both are popular with tourists in summer; nearby there are camping and ancient woods. Facing the Adriatic coast you can see a station for the extraction of methane full open sea.

Economy 
The region has a strong economic induction thanks to tourism, very present thanks to the exceptional landscape of the coast that has remained in the imagination of many foreigners as a symbol of Italy.

Cycle track 

Along the Trabocchi coast there are plans for an Adriatic cycle way (1000 km, to run along the Adriatic coast from the Delta of the River Po to Apulia) along the abandoned line of the Adriatic railway (49 km).

Beaches 

Lido Riccio (Ortona)
Punta Ripari di Giobbe (Ortona)
Lido Saraceni (Ortona)
Punta Acquabella (Ortona)
Punta Mucchiola (San Vito)
Molo di San Vito Marina
Calata Turchino (San Vito)
Punta del Guardiano (San Vito)
Valle Grotte (San Vito)
Punta Cavalluccio (Rocca San Giovanni)
Costa di Fossacesia
Golfo di Venere (Fossacesia)
Le Morge (Torino di Sangro)
Punta Penna (Casalbordino -Vasto)
Punta Aderci (Vasto)
Punta Vignola (Vasto)
Lido di San Salvo Marina

Trabocchi 

Many trabocchi of the coast have been converted into restaurants.

 Trabocco Fosso Canale
 Trabocco Punta Tufano
 Trabocco San Gregorio
 Trabocco Turchino
 Trabocco Valle Grotte
 Trabocco Sasso della Cajana
 Trabocco Punta Isolata
 Trabocco Punta Cavalluccio
 Trabocco Pesce Palombo
 Trabocco Punta Punciosa
 Trabocco Punta Rocciosa
 Trabocco Le Morge
 Trabocco di Casalbordino
 Trabocco di Punta Penna
 Trabocco di Vasto Marina
 Trabocco Zi' Nicola di San Salvo

The Promontory Dannunziano San Vito 

The seaside town of San Vito Chietino is famous because the stretch of Trabocchi Coast, halfway between San Vito and Fossacesia, there is a hermitage where the 800 was built there a home to fishermen, that Gabriele d'Annunzio in 1889 bought and renovated it for his personal living with her lover Barbara Leoni. The house and the hermitage everything is called hermitage D'Annunzio, or promontory D'Annunzio, and is now a private museum. Architectural style seems to be a typical building of the nineteenth century rural architecture of Abruzzo. The part of the building used by the poet is not experiencing any degradation. The plant has a square base. The facade on the square is on two levels with elements in medieval style Lombard. On the ground floor there is a porch that follows the upstairs including the central part of the facade is advanced to the rest of the building. On the sides there are two arches. The front is in sandstone.

D'Annunzio as a setting also a part of his novel Il trionfo della morte (1894), in which the protagonist Giorgio Aurispa arrives in the small village sanvitese with her lover Hippolyta. Back from disappointment in the country of Guardiagrele of the discovery of financial ruin of his noble family, Giorgio seeking rest in the sea, and studies the Thus Spake Zarathustra of Nietzsche, learning the philosophy of Superman. George, however, fails to fuse his naturalistic thought and what superoministico disruptive, and experience it first witnessing scenes of popular superstition in San Vito, when it is feared that a child is kidnapped at night by witches, and when a child is found drowned into the sea by his mother; and then going on pilgrimage in the nearby village of Casalbordino. There, at the Shrine of Our Lady of Miracles, Giorgio Aurispa is overwhelmed by the horror of superstition of local farmers, which are lowered to the states most miserable, reduced to larvae, to achieve the miracle of Madonna.

Today on the promontory restaurants have sprung up dedicated to the poet Pescara, and also a public park with a gazebo, where is buried the mistress of d'Annunzio: Barbara Leoni.

Documentation 
Between 2011 and 2012 the director Anna Cavasinni made a documentary lasting 58 minutes on the coast teatina relative to overflow. The documentary is titled precisely "The Trabocchi Coast" and is released on DVD. In these months being shown in major centers in the Abruzzo coast and the screening is followed by a debate with the public and with the authorities. The documentary is part of a project documentation and memory enhancement Abruzzo that the Cultural Association Territories-Link is conducting a long time.

Current events 
Since 2007 is an ongoing harsh mobilization of the population on the coast and in the Abruzzi,  aimed at preventing the construction of mining and Oil processing in the territory.

The first plant that has aroused the concern of the people was the so-called middle oils, or a large plant (127,000 m2) dehydrosulphurization of crude oil, designed by Eni. The affected area is to Feudo, in the heart of wine production of Abruzzo. The fears of the population regarding the impact on health of exposure to hydrogen sulfide, the destruction of the flourishing agricultural economy and the negative effects on tourism. The plant is expected to arise in fact very close to the coast of the Trabocchi.

Recently, the regional law n. 14 of 2009, suspended the construction of the center, but many companies have submitted projects for the construction of offshore platforms for the extraction and processing of oil, is not affected by this law.

As published May 6, 2010, from the website www.diebucke.it, April 18 took place in San Vito a demonstration against the petrolizzazione Abruzzo coast that has gathered about 5000 participants. Also according to the article by Francesco Amoroso, "The people of Abruzzo are engaging pressuring local politicians by sending them letters and e-mail (addresses are easily available on the Internet) trying to compensate for the pressure on the other side shall be held by Eni and Mog."

See also 
 Economy of Abruzzo
 Cuisine of Abruzzo
 Tourism in Italy
 Tourism in Abruzzo

References

External links
 Sito turistico sulla Costa dei Trabocchi
 Trabocchi
 Costa dei Trabocchi
 La Costa dei Trabocchi

 	

Adriatic Sea
Coasts of Italy
.
Landforms of Abruzzo
Province of Chieti
Seaside resorts in Italy
Tourist attractions in Abruzzo
Tourism in Italy
Tourism in Abruzzo